Corybas hispidus, commonly known as the bristly helmet orchid, is a species of orchid endemic to eastern Australia. It is distinguished from other helmet orchids by its autumn to winter flowering period, and by its labellum, which has a bristly-hairy, creamy-white centre and is deeply notched along its top edge.

Description
Corybas hispidus is a terrestrial, perennial, deciduous herb with an underground tuber. The single flower is reddish-purple and white with a greenish-grey dorsal sepal with red or dark purple spots. The central "boss" of the labellum is dome-shaped and white with a notch at the top and the surface is covered with short, stiff bristles. Flowering is from March to August.

Taxonomy and naming
Corybas hispidus was first formally described in 1973 by David Jones from a specimen found near the village of Wulgulmerang. The description was published in The Victorian Naturalist. It was the first of many orchids described by Jones. The specific epithet (hispidus) is a Latin word meaning "bristly", "rough", "hairy" or "prickly".

Distribution and habitat
Bristly helmet orchid occurs in south-east Queensland, on the ranges and tablelands of New South Wales and in sheltered sites in far north-eastern Victoria.

References

External links
 

hispidus
Endemic orchids of Australia
Orchids of New South Wales
Orchids of Queensland
Orchids of Victoria (Australia)
Plants described in 1973